Toilet Böys was the final studio album by the NYC punk band, the Toilet Böys. A reviewer best described the album as the following;

According to lead-guitarist Sean, due to limited studio time, this album had a much more 'poppy' sound as opposed to their older, crunchier albums. He attributed this to the album's extensive use of Pro Tools.

Track listing

 Party Starts Now    3:28 
 Heartstopper    3:15 
 Can't Wait   2:55 
 Future Is Now    3:45 
 Saturday Nite    2:53 
 Hollywood    5:20 
 Runaway    2:27 
 Ride    3:44 
 Another Day in the Life    3:30 
 Good Times Roll    3:20 
 Blue Halo    3:18 
 Rock 'N' Roll Whore    3:27 
 Kiss in the Wind    4:47 
 Feels Good  5:07 (hidden track)
 Original Sinner (Japanese bonus track)

References

Toilet Böys albums
2001 albums